Bhiwandi  is a city, near Thane city in the Thane district in Maharashtra, India. The city is a part of the Mumbai Metropolitan Region.

Bhiwandi is a commercial city and a major trade center that connects Mumbai and the rest of India through the Mumbai–Agra highway. It is known for its textile industry, though in recent years, economic downturn has forced the closure of a large portion of the sector.

Bhiwandi lies in the Konkan coastal lowland, a region known geographically for its hills and streams. The city houses the tehsil headquarters of Bhiwandi, and it is administered by the Bhiwandi-Nizampur Municipal Corporation. According to the 2021 census, the total population of the Bhiwandi-Nizampur Municipal Corporation area is 874,032.

Business and employment 
The city of Bhiwandi has the largest number of power looms and handlooms in the country. The majority of the population is employed in the power loom sector. The second-largest power loom, after the one in Surat, is located in Bhiwandi. Since 2012, the city's textile industry has been in decline, partly caused by the sudden enactment of new goods and services taxes. Another concern facing textile producers is a lack of contact with buyers, leading many to sell primarily to middlemen, mostly from Gujrat, who charge significant markup prices. Bhiwandi has also a red light area.

Bhiwandi initially developed as an industrial hub for the textile industry, but more recently has hosted other industries and logistics sectors. Bhiwandi is among Asia's biggest warehousing hubs; its godowns are considered Asia's largest. It is a major contributor to the logistic landscape of Mumbai and India due to its close proximity to the Nhava Seva port of Mumbai, India's financial capital. Many e-commerce companies like Amazon, Flipkart, Reliance Industries, Snapdeal, and FedEx have branches in the city. The city is the next developed region for MMRDA, which has developed other regions such as the Bandra–Kurla Complex, Mumbai Metro, Monorail Project, and Eastern Freeway.

Bhiwandi's economy is divided into three sectors: textiles, groceries, and service (supplying, logging, and food delivery). During the COVID-19 pandemic, small hotels faced significant challenges.

Infrastructure 

Bhiwandi's infrastructure is centered around the national highway which passes through it.

Bhiwandi has a large water treatment plant at Panjrapur with 455 MLD capacity, making it one of the largest water treatment plants in Asia.

A city bus proposal was scheduled to be realised in Bhiwandi but was canceled due to the Auto Rickshaw strike. Bhiwandi has a central railway station at Anjur Phata. The train station has a link with the central railways and the local train of Mumbai as well. Bhiwandi Metro Project (Mumbai Metro line 5) is proposed with completion anticipated in 2025.

Climate

See also
B.N.N. College

References

 
Talukas in Maharashtra
Textile industry in Maharashtra
Cities in Maharashtra